The GCC Champions League, is an annually organized football league tournament for club of the Arabian Peninsula.

The 2003 edition was the 20th time that it was organised and was won by Kuwaiti side Al Arabi Kuwait for the second time.

Results

All match were played in  Kuwait.

Al-Muharraq came second on the toss of a coin

Winner

 
 

GCC Champions League
Gulf Club Champions Cup, 2003